Black Hole Quencher 1 (BHQ1) is an example of dark quencher, which is used to quench green and yellow dyes, such as 6-carboxyfluorescein (6-FAM), tetrachlorofluorescein (TET), and hexachlorofluorescein (HEX). The role of quenchers is to absorb energy from a fluorophore and to re-emit the energy in the form of either heat (dark quenchers) or visible light (fluorescent quenchers). The absorption range of BHQ1 is from 480 to 580 nm with maximum absorption at 534 nm.

See also 
 Quenching (fluorescence)

References 

Fluorescent dyes
Diazo compounds
Nitro compounds
Ethanolamines
Methoxy compounds